Huang Hui-Wen (born February 3, 1980 in Hualien, Taiwan) is a Taiwanese softball player. She competed for Chinese Taipei at the 2004 and 2008 Summer Olympics.

References

Living people
1980 births
Olympic softball players of Taiwan
Taiwanese softball players
Softball players at the 2004 Summer Olympics
Softball players at the 2008 Summer Olympics
People from Hualien County
Softball players
Asian Games medalists in softball
Softball players at the 2002 Asian Games
Softball players at the 2006 Asian Games
Softball players at the 2010 Asian Games
Softball players at the 2014 Asian Games
Medalists at the 2002 Asian Games
Medalists at the 2006 Asian Games
Medalists at the 2010 Asian Games
Medalists at the 2014 Asian Games
Asian Games silver medalists for Chinese Taipei
Asian Games bronze medalists for Chinese Taipei
21st-century Taiwanese women